A Walk to Remember is a 2002 American coming-of-age romantic drama film directed by Adam Shankman and written by Karen Janszen, based on Nicholas Sparks' 1999 novel of the same name. The film stars Shane West, Mandy Moore, Peter Coyote and Daryl Hannah, and was produced by Denise Di Novi and Hunt Lowry for Warner Bros. Pictures.

The novel's 1950s setting was changed to the late 1990s to early 2000s for the film, as the producers were concerned it might not appeal to teenage audiences. The film was shot in the summer of 2001 for 39 days in Wilmington, North Carolina, with many of the sets borrowed from the television series Dawson's Creek. The film, as with the book, is dedicated to Sparks' sister Danielle, whose cancer-afflicted life inspired the story.

A Walk to Remember was theatrically released on January 25, 2002, and was a box office success, grossing $47.5 million against its $11.8 million budget. The film received generally negative reviews from critics, most of whom criticized its blandness and predictability, while others praised its sincerity and the lead actors' performances. The film was released on DVD in July 2002, and a "Family-Edited Version" was later released in December.

Plot
In Beaufort, North Carolina, popular and rebellious high school senior Landon Carter and his friends have illegally drunk on school grounds. They lure a new student, Clay Gephardt, to a factory, hoping to "prank" him, with an initiation task into their elite friendship group. However, Clay becomes seriously injured, which is brought to the attention of the school principal through law enforcement.

In an effort to avoid law involvement, the principal gives Landon the choice of being expelled from the school or completing several service projects which include weekend tutoring, janitorial duties, and participation in the school play. Choosing the latter, Landon is further acquainted with Jamie Sullivan, the local Baptist minister's daughter. He never before interacted with her due to the status quo at the high school, though they have known each other most of their lives.

Landon begins to struggle with the play and reluctantly seeks guidance from Jamie, who agrees to help him on the condition that he will not fall in love with her, but Landon dismisses it as a foolish idea. They begin practicing together at her house after school. A bond begins to form between them until Landon is rude to Jamie at school to impress his friends, and she realizes Landon wants to keep their friendship a secret from others, so she decides to distance herself. Landon decides to get his act together, when he got a wake up call from Jamie. He reconciled with Clay and apologized about what happened and decided to learn his lines himself.

On the opening night of the play, Jamie astounds Landon and the audience with her voice and beauty. When Jamie finishes singing towards the end, Landon impulsively kisses her just before the curtain closes. Afterwards, Jamie avoids Landon until his friends play a cruel prank on her, led by Belinda, his resentful ex-girlfriend who wants them to reconcile despite Landon's lack of interest. In opposition to his friends, he defends her and she eventually warms to him again. He asks her to go on a date, to which Jamie reveals that she is not allowed to date. Landon visits the church in order to ask her father for permission. He is initially hesitant but agrees.

Their first date is a success, and it leads to another. Their relationship strengthens as they genuinely fall for each other, and all seems well. During a date, however, Jamie confesses she is not making any plans for the future because she has leukemia and has not been responding to treatment. Her condition grows worse and she gets sent to the hospital. Landon drives off to beg for help for her from his estranged father who is a doctor. Landon drives back in tears after feeling disappointed by his father's inability to help.

Upon learning of Jamie's condition, Landon's friends come to him and apologize for their past treatment of her, offering their support. While she is admitted, Jamie gives Landon a book that once belonged to her deceased mother and tells him he is her angel. Unbeknownst to Landon, she is provided with private home care through his father to relieve her father's financial burden.

Landon builds a telescope for Jamie to see a star that he named after her, with help from her father. It is then that he asks her to marry him. Jamie tearfully accepts, and they get married in the church where her mother was married. Landon reflects that their last summer together was spent as husband and wife, and that she had died soon after.

Four years later, Landon returns to Beaufort to visit Jamie's father, revealing that he had been accepted into medical school. When Landon laments that Jamie was never able to witness a miracle, her father replies that the miracle was Landon himself.

Hereafter, Landon expresses sorrow over Jamie's passing, but describes their love like the wind: he cannot see it, but he can feel it.

Cast

Production

Development
The inspiration for A Walk to Remember was Nicholas Sparks' sister, Danielle Sparks Lewis, who died of cancer in 2000. In a speech he gave after her death in Berlin, the author admits that "In many ways, Jamie Sullivan was my younger sister". The plot was inspired by her life; Danielle met a man who wanted to marry her, "even when he knew she was sick, even when he knew that she might not make it". Both the book and film are dedicated to Danielle Sparks Lewis.

It was filmed in Wilmington, North Carolina in the summer of 2001, at the same time that Divine Secrets of the Ya-Ya Sisterhood (2002) and the television show Dawson's Creek were being filmed there. Many of the sets were from Dawson's Creek (1998) – particularly the school, hospital and Landon's home. The total shooting time was only 39 days, despite Moore being able to only work 10 hours a day because she was a minor. Daryl Hannah, who wore a brown wig as her character, had received a collagen injection in her lips, which went awry and caused noticeable swelling. By the end of filming, however, the symptoms were less obvious.

Casting
Director Shankman wanted the lead characters to be portrayed by young actors: "I wanted young actors with whom teenagers could connect", he said. Shankman arranged a meeting with Shane West after he saw him in a magazine. He was looking for someone who could transition from being very dark to very light. He described his choice as "an instinct" he had about West, who would appear in almost every scene and had "to be either incredibly angry and self-hating or madly in love and heroic." West said: "I don't generally read love stories, but after reading the screenplay, I knew I couldn't wait to read the book so I could truly understand Nicholas Sparks' story and how he envisioned the character of Landon. It's a beautiful story and the characters are very believable, which is what attracted me to the project.

Shankman said of Moore that she "has the voice and the face of an angel" and added that she is luminous. Moore explained that she was moved by the book: "I had such a visceral reaction to it that I remember not being able to read because I was almost hyperventilating while I was crying." Commenting on the film, she said: "It was my first movie and I know people say it may be cliche and it's a tearjerker or it's cheesy, but for me, it's the thing I'm most proud of."

Comparisons to novel
While there are many similarities to the novel by Nicholas Sparks, many changes were made. On his personal website, Sparks explains the decisions behind the differences. For example, he and the producer decided to update the setting from the 1950s to the 1990s, worrying that a film set in the 50s would fail to draw teens. "To interest them," he writes, "we had to make the story more contemporary." To make the update believable, Landon's pranks and behavior are worse than they are in the novel; as Sparks notes, "the things that teen boys did in the 1950s to be considered a little 'rough' are different than what teen boys in the 1990s do to be considered 'rough.'"

Sparks and the producer also changed the play in which Landon and Jamie appear. In the novel, Hegbert wrote a Christmas play that illustrated how he once struggled as a father. Due to time constraints, the sub-plot showing how he overcame his struggles could not be included in the film. Sparks was concerned that "people who hadn't read the book would question whether Hegbert was a good father", adding that "because he is a good father and we didn't want that question to linger, we changed the play."

A significant difference is that at the end of the novel, unlike the film, it is ambiguous whether Jamie died or simply disappeared into the shadow world. Sparks says that he had written the book knowing she would die, yet had "grown to love Jamie Sullivan", and so opted for "the solution that best described the exact feeling I had with regard to my sister at that point: namely, that I hoped she would live."

Soundtrack

The film's soundtrack was released by Moore's first label Epic Records and Sony Music Soundtrax on January 15, 2002. It features six songs by Moore and others by acts Switchfoot, Rachael Lampa and many more.

Reception

Box office
A Walk to Remember grossed $41,281,092 in North America and $6,213,824 in other territories for a worldwide total of $47,494,916.

In its opening weekend, the film grossed $12,177,488, finishing third at the box office behind Black Hawk Down ($17,012,268) and Snow Dogs ($13,079,373).

Critical reception 
The film received generally negative reviews from critics. On Rotten Tomatoes the film has an approval rating of 27% based on reviews from 105 critics, with an average rating of 4.1/10. The site's critical consensus says: "Though wholesome, the Mandy Moore vehicle A Walk to Remember is also bland and oppressively syrupy." On Metacritic the film has a weighted average score of 35 out of 100, based on 26 reviews, which indicates "generally unfavorable". Audiences surveyed by CinemaScore gave the film a grade A on scale of A to F.

Entertainment Weekly retitled the film "A Walk to Forget". Michael O'Sullivan of The Washington Post wrote: "If you can't see everything in this film coming from a mile away, then you really need to get out more." Stephanie Zacharek of Salon.com wrote: "A vehicle for teen singing sensation Mandy Moore. As vehicles go, it's an Edsel." In 2010, Time named it one of the ten worst chick flicks ever made.

Other reviews were more positive, Joe Leydon of Variety wrote : "As Carter, Shane West makes an appealingly persuasive transition from embittered cynic to earnest romantic. Moore, looking a bit like Phoebe Cates’ kid sister, does a fine job of conveying Jamie's strong religious convictions as one of many admirable elements in young woman's personality. [...] As lead characters discuss their faith — or, in Carter's case, the lack thereof — actors are able to make those conversations sound perfectly natural, enabling pic to avoid any trace of overt preachiness." Chicago Sun-Times''' film critic Roger Ebert praised Moore and West for their "quietly convincing" acting performances. The Chicago Reader felt that the story "has a fair amount of nuance and charm". The San Francisco Chronicle reviewer Octavio Roca found the film "entertaining" and wrote: "The picture is shamelessly manipulative, but in the best melodramatic sense." S. Williams of Momzone magazine felt that the movie was "everything a chick flick should be" and praised Shankman's direction. Us Weekly deemed it one of the 30 most romantic movies of all time. The film found a warmer reception with the general public, particularly in the Christian community for the film's moral values; as one reviewer from Christianity Today approvingly noted, "The main character is portrayed as a Christian without being psychopathic or holier-than-thou".

Accolades

Home mediaA Walk to Remember was released by Warner Home Video on DVD on July 9, 2002. The DVD contains two commentaries, one featuring Shane West, Mandy Moore, and director Adam Shankman; the second featuring screenwriter Karen Janszen and author Nicholas Sparks. Also included is the music video for Moore's single "Cry", and the film's theatrical trailer. A "Family-Edited Version" was later released on December 24, 2002.

In other media
In the HBO television series Entourage, the character of Vincent Chase was credited as having a small supporting role in the film. In the fictional Entourage universe, Chase has an on-set relationship with Moore during the filming of A Walk to Remember.

See also
 Love Story'' (1970), a film with similar theme

References

External links
 
 

2000s coming-of-age drama films
2000s teen drama films
2000s teen romance films
2002 films
2002 romantic drama films
American coming-of-age drama films
American romantic drama films
American teen drama films
American teen romance films
Carteret County, North Carolina
Coming-of-age romance films
2000s English-language films
Films about cancer
Films about death
Films about weddings
Films based on romance novels
Films based on works by Nicholas Sparks
Films directed by Adam Shankman
Films produced by Denise Di Novi
Films set in North Carolina
Films set in the 1990s
Films shot in North Carolina
Warner Bros. films
2000s American films